David Templeman was a Scottish professional footballer who played as a right back in the Scottish League for Arthurlie and Airdrieonians.

Personal life 
Templeman's brother Willie was also a footballer. Templeman served in the 63rd (Royal Naval) Division during the First World War and after being wounded a second time, he was evacuated to Britain in late 1915.

Career statistics

References 

Scottish footballers
Association football fullbacks
1893 births
Date of death missing
Place of birth missing
Scottish Football League players
Arthurlie F.C. players
Airdrieonians F.C. (1878) players
63rd (Royal Naval) Division soldiers
Royal Navy personnel of World War I
Scottish military personnel